Antoine Valentinelli (born 4 December 1991 in Paris), better known by his stage name Lomepal, is a French rapper and singer from the 13th arrondissement of Paris. He has released five EPs, and three studio albums: Flip, released in June 2017, Jeannine, released in December 2018, both certified double platinum by the SNEP, and Mauvais Ordre, released in September 2022. 

His stage name comes from the fact that his friends always thought he was sick because of his pale complexion, hence Lomepal (for "the pale man"). His first stage name was Jo Pump. He is friends with the Belgian rapper Roméo Elvis, with whom he collaborated on the song "1000°C" for Lomepal's album Jeannine. 

In 2017, he performed more than a hundred live shows and received over 100 million views on his YouTube channel.

On 8 December 2018, Antoine released his second studio album Jeannine, titled after his grandmother who suffered from schizophrenia, from which he drew inspiration. Rather than focus on the suffering she underwent, he instead explored themes that use the illness as a power rather than a burden.

On 25 October 2019 Antoine released the album, Amina. The album is essentially a deluxe version of his album Jeannine including all of its songs, with some having been remixed, replaced with a live/acoustic version or somehow modified.

On 2 September 2021, in an interview for France Inter, Valentinelli announced the release of his third album in 2022.

Discography

Albums

Extended plays

Singles

Other charted songs

References

1991 births
French rappers
French people of Italian descent
Living people